Gerry Ryan (born 4 October 1955) is a former Irish professional football player who was born in Dublin.

Ryan began his career at Bohemians on 9 February 1975 and after 14 goals in 53 appearances he earned him a move to Derby County in 1977. He was later moved to Brighton for £100,000 with whom he played in the 1983 FA Cup Final against Manchester United before his career was ended in 1985 after a broken leg sustained in a tackle from Crystal Palace's Henry Hughton.

He played eighteen times for Ireland between 1978 and 1984. Ryan made his debut in April 1978, when he played in a 4-2 win against Turkey in a friendly at Lansdowne Road. His only goal for Ireland came over a year later at the same venue, but it was only a consolation effort as Ireland lost 3-1 to West Germany in a friendly. Ryan's last appearance in a green shirt came in 1984 when he played in a scoreless draw against Mexico at Dalymount Park. Also earned one cap for the Republic of Ireland U21 side.

After his retirement from the professional game, Ryan bought and ran The Witch Inn in Lindfield, West Sussex, with his wife Simeon. He turned out regularly for The Witch in the Lewes Sunday League.
 
Ryan was admitted to hospital on 18 August 2007 after suffering a stroke. Ryan's recovery from the stroke left him with a weakness in his left side and he decided to sell The Witch.

Honours
League of Ireland: 1
 Bohemians 1974/75
FAI Cup: 1
 Bohemians 1976
Leinster Senior Cup: 2
 Bohemians 1974/75, 1975/76

External links
Career Stats

References

1955 births
Living people
Place of birth missing (living people)
Republic of Ireland association footballers
Republic of Ireland international footballers
Republic of Ireland under-21 international footballers
Bohemian F.C. players
Association footballers from County Dublin
League of Ireland players
League of Ireland XI players
Brighton & Hove Albion F.C. players
Derby County F.C. players
English Football League players
Association football forwards